Michael Mohun (1616? – buried 11 October 1684) was a leading English actor both before and after the 1642–60 closing of the theatres.

Mohun began his stage career as a boy player filling female roles; he was part of Christopher Beeston's theatrical establishment at the Cockpit Theatre, "eventually becoming a key member of Queen Henrietta's Men."

For the period from 1642 to 1659, Mohun was an officer in military units loyal to the House of Stuart; he served in England, Ireland, and the Low Countries, and rose to the rank of major. He was seriously wounded at Dublin, and was a prisoner of war for two extended periods.

At the end of the English Interregnum, Mohun was one of the men — George Jolly and John Rhodes were others — who attempted to restart dramatic performance. In 1659 Mohun performed with other pre-Commonwealth actors in an unlicensed troupe at the Red Bull Theatre. As the manager of the troupe, Mohun came to an agreement with the Master of the Revels to pay fees for the privilege of performing; but eventually, like Jolly and Rhodes, he was out-manoeuvred by Thomas Killigrew and Sir William Davenant. After a complex power struggle for the two company patents issued by Charles II at the Restoration of the monarchy, Mohun became a full sharer in Killigrew's King's Company. Along with Charles Hart, the other leading male actor, Mohun was in a position of some authority, often signing official papers on behalf of the sharing actors. He remained a member of the King's Company until he left the stage on account of age and ill-health in the late 1670s.

Mohun regularly acted leading and major roles, mostly villains. His interpretations of Iago and of the title role in Ben Jonson's Volpone were famous, and he brought a sinister edge to the part of Pinchwife in William Wycherley's The Country Wife. Mohun repeatedly seconded Charles Hart's leads, playing Iago to Hart's Othello, and Cassius to Hart's Brutus.

Mohun compiled a long list of noteworthy other roles in his career. He played Bellamente in Shirley's Love's Cruelty both before 1642 and after 1660, and he acted in other revivals besides those named above. He played:

 Face in The Alchemist
 Truewit in Epicene
 Leontius in The Humorous Lieutenant
 Don Leon in Rule a Wife and Have a Wife
 Melantius in The Maid's Tragedy
 Mardonius in A King and No King
 Aubrey in Rollo Duke of Normandy.

He took roles in contemporary Restoration dramas, by John Dryden —

 Maximin in Tyrannick Love
 Ventidius in All for Love
 Rhodophil in Marriage à la mode
 the Old Emperor in Aureng-zebe
 Beaumont in Amboyna
 Philocles in The Maiden Queen
 Belamy in An Evening's Love
 the Emperor in The Indian Emperour
 the Duke of Mantua in The Assignation

— and by other playwrights:

 Pinchwife in Wycherly's The Country Wife
 Clytus in Nathaniel Lee's The Rival Queens
 Augustus Caesar in Lee's Gloriana
 Britannicus in Lee's The Tragedy of Nero
 Hannibal in Lee's Sophonisba, or Hannibal's Overthrow
 Mythridates in Lee's Mythridates, King of Pontus
 Lord Burleigh in John Banks's The Unhappy Favourite
 Matthias in John Crowne's The Destruction of Jerusalem
 Breakbond in Edward Howard's The Man of Newmarket
 King Edward III in The Black Prince by Roger Boyle, 1st Earl of Orrery.

Mohun retired from the stage in 1682, when the King's Company joined with the Duke's Company to form the United Company. He had trouble obtaining his pension; his petition to King Charles II on the subject is valuable for the amount of autobiographical material it contains.

Notes

Sources
 Astington, John H. "Actors and the Court After 1642." Early Modern Literary Studies, Special Issue 15 (August 2007).
 Brown, Charles Cedric, ed. Patronage, Politics, and Literary Traditions in England, 1558–1658. Detroit,  Wayne State University Press, 1993.
 Highfill, Philip Jr, Burnim, Kalman A., and Langhans, Edward (1973–93). Biographical Dictionary of Actors, Actresses, Musicians, Dancers, Managers and Other Stage Personnel in London, 1660–1800. 16 volumes. Carbondale, Illinois: Southern Illinois University Press.
 Nunzeger, Edwin. A Dictionary of Actors and of Other Persons Associated with the Public Representation of Plays in England Before 1642. New Haven, Yale University Press, 1929.
 Thomson, Peter. The Cambridge Introduction to English Theatre, 1660–1900. Cambridge, Cambridge University Press, 2006.

1684 deaths
English male stage actors
English male Shakespearean actors
Year of birth uncertain
17th-century English male actors